Kosmos 967 ( meaning Cosmos 967) is a satellite which was used as a target for tests of anti-satellite weapons. It was launched by the Soviet Union in 1977 as part of the Dnepropetrovsk Sputnik programme, and used as a target for Kosmos 970 and Kosmos 1009, as part of the Istrebitel Sputnikov programme.

It was launched aboard a Kosmos-3M carrier rocket, from Site 132/1 at the Plesetsk Cosmodrome. The launch occurred at 15:53 UTC on 13 December 1977.

It was successfully intercepted by Kosmos 970 in a non-destructive test on 21 December 1977. It was then re-used by Kosmos 1009 on 19 May 1978. Both tests were successful, and both left Kosmos 967 intact. As of 2009, it is still in orbit.

Kosmos 967 was the seventh of ten Lira satellites to be launched, of which all but the first were successful. Lira was derived from the earlier DS-P1-M satellite, which it replaced.

See also

1977 in spaceflight

References

1977 in spaceflight
Kosmos satellites
Spacecraft launched in 1977
Dnepropetrovsk Sputnik program